This article displays the squads for the 2015 World Men's Handball Championship. Each team consists of 16 players. Yet, two players might be replaced, Every player who played is listed, thus some lists have more than 16. 

Age, caps and goals correct as of 15 January 2015.

Group A

Belarus
A 21-player preliminary squad was announced on 19 December 2014.

Head coach:  Yuri Shevtsov

Brazil
A 20-player preliminary squad was announced on 23 December 2014. On 31 December 2014, 17 players were nominated.

Head coach:  Jordi Ribera

Chile
A 28-player preliminary squad was announced on 15 December 2014.

Head coach: Fernando Capurro

Qatar
A 28-player preliminary squad was announced on 15 December 2014.

Head coach:  Valero Rivera

Slovenia
A 26-player preliminary squad was announced on 15 December 2014. It was trimmed down to 22 on 2 January 2015. On 7 January 2015, 19 players were nominated.

Head coach: Boris Denič

Spain
A 20-player preliminary squad was announced on 16 December 2014. On 29 December 2014 an 18-player list was published. On 12 January 2015, the final 16-player squad was announced.

Head coach: Manolo Cadenas

Group B

Austria
A 23-player preliminary squad was announced on 2 January 2015. On 9 January 2015, an 18-player squad was announced.

Head coach:  Patrekur Jóhannesson

Bosnia and Herzegovina
A 23-player preliminary squad was announced on 17 December 2014. It was trimmed down to 20 on 30 December 2014.

Head coach: Dragan Marković

Croatia
A 20-player preliminary squad was announced on 23 December 2014. An 18-player squad was announced on 30 December 2014. A final 16-player squad was announced on 13 January 2015.

Head coach: Slavko Goluža

Iran
A 22-player preliminary squad was announced on 28 December 2014. An 18-player squad was revealed on 13 January 2015.

Head coach:  Borut Maček

Macedonia
A 21-player preliminary squad was announced on 15 December 2014. An 18-player squad was announced on 5 January 2015.

Head coach:  Ivica Obrvan

Tunisia
An 18-player preliminary squad was announced on 30 December 2014.

Head coach:  Sead Hasanefendić

Group C

Algeria
A 24-player preliminary squad was announced on 20 December 2014.

Head coach: Reda Zeguili

Czech Republic
A 13-player squad was announced on 11 December 2014. 18 players were selected on 9 January 2015. The 16-player squad was published on 10 January 2015.

Head coach: Jan Filip / Daniel Kubeš

Egypt
A 19-player preliminary squad was announced on 12 December 2014.

Head coach: Marwan Ragab

France
A 20-player preliminary squad was announced on 6 December 2014. A 17-player squad was announced on 13 January 2015.

Head coach: Claude Onesta

Iceland
A 20-player preliminary squad was announced on 18 December 2014. On 11 January 2015 a 17-player squad was published.

Head coach: Aron Kristjánsson

Sweden
The squad was announced on 15 December 2014. On 8 January 2015, Magnus Persson replaced Johan Jakobsson due to an injury.

Head coach: Ola Lindgren / Staffan Olsson

Group D

Argentina
An 18-player preliminary squad was announced on 26 December 2014.

Head coach: Eduardo Gallardo

Denmark
A 19-player preliminary squad was announced on 18 December 2014. It was reduced to 17 players on 11 January 2015.

Head coach:  Guðmundur Guðmundsson

Germany
A 19-player preliminary squad was announced on 22 December 2014.

Head coach:  Dagur Sigurðsson

Poland
A 23-player preliminary squad was announced on 27 December 2014. On 8 January 2015 it was reduced to 18.

Head coach:  Michael Biegler

Russia
A 21-player preliminary squad was announced on 24 December 2014. It was reduced to 18 on 10 January 2015.

Head coach: Oleg Kuleshov

Saudi Arabia
A 21-player preliminary squad was announced on 2 December 2014. On 4 January 2015 the list was trimmed to 17.

Head coach:  Goran Dzokic

Statistics

Player representation by league system
League systems with 10 or more players represented are listed. In all, World Cup squad members play for clubs in 54 different countries, and play in 51 different national leagues.

The Germany and Saudi Arabia men's national handball team|Saudi Arabian squad is made up entirely of players from the country's domestic league. Slovenia have only one domestic-based player. Of the countries not represented by a national team at the World Cup, Hungarian league provides the most squad members.

Player representation by club
Clubs with 10 or more players represented are listed.

Coaches representation by country
Coaches in bold represent their own country.

References

2015 squads
World Men's Handball Championship squads